Monsoon Raaga is a 2022 Indian Kannada-language drama film directed by S Ravindranath. Monsoon Raaga is the remake of the Telugu film C/o Kancharapalem (2018) featuring Dhanajaya and Rachita Ram. The music is composed by J. Anoop Seelin. The film is produced by A R Vikhyath under Vikhyath Chitra Productions. The film received positive reviews

Cast 
Dhanajaya as Katte, who works at a wine store
Rachita Ram as Asma Begum, a sex worker
Yasha Shivakumar as Raga Sudha, a Brahmin girl 
Achyuth Kumar as Raju, a bachelor who later marries Hasini
Suhasini Maniratnam as Hasini, a widow and has a 20-year-old daughter
Nihal as Sundara
Suchitra as Sinchana

Release
The film was released on 16 September 2022. The digital streaming rights were acquired by ZEE5 and will be premiered on 9 December 2022.

Reception 
Sharadhaa of The New Indian Express gave a rating of 3 out of 5 and wrote that "Monsoon Raaga is a slow-moving film that does create some confusion in the beginning, however, the characters steal the show. In a nutshell, Monsoon Raaga makes for a realistic experience for romantic hearts". While comparing it with the original film, Shivani Kava of The News Minute wrote: "This slice-of-life drama remains a notch below the original". Echoing the same, Muralidhara Khajane of The Hindu wrote: "Despite commendable performances by the cast, the Kannada remake of ‘C/o Kancharapalem’ has been visualised with pure commercial interest, lacking the charm of the original".

References

External links 
 

Indian drama films
2020s Kannada-language films
2022 films
Films shot in Karnataka
2022 drama films
Films set in Karnataka
Kannada remakes of Telugu films
Slice of life films
Indian anthology films